Simon Greenish  is a British Chartered Civil Engineer and museum director.

Greenish studied Engineering at Durham University, graduating with a third in 1971.

In 1995, Greenish joined the Royal Air Force Museum to lead a £30 million development. In 2005, he became Director of Collections at the museum. In 2006, he was appointed Director of Bletchley Park when it was in financial
difficulties. He led the initiative to make the Bletchley Park Trust financially secure and raise the awareness of the importance of the site as part of Britain's heritage. He helped to raise £10 million to restore the Bletchley Park site and retired from his post in 2012, to be succeeded by Iain Standen. In 2017, he contributed a chapter to The Turing Guide on recent developments at Bletchley Park.

Greenish was appointed to an MBE in 2013 for services to English Heritage. He also has an honorary degree from the University of Bedfordshire. He currently resides in Felmersham, Bedfordshire.

References

External links
 Simon Greenish, Bletchley Park Trust CEO talk on Vimeo, 2009
 

Year of birth missing (living people)
Living people
Alumni of Grey College, Durham
Directors of museums in the United Kingdom
Bletchley Park people
English civil engineers
Members of the Order of the British Empire
People associated with the University of Bedfordshire
People from Felmersham